Football Saved My Life was a 10-part sports reality show commissioned from Granada Productions by ITV STUDIOS for Bravo. It was initially entitled "Saved by the Ball". This program took a group of 15 dysfunctional men and turned their lives around through the medium of football. The men all faced one or more present day life issues, including too much drinking, too much smoking, poor diet, anger management, depression, confidence and gambling.

Ex-premiership footballer and self-confessed ex-alcoholic, Neil Ruddock took the manager position, along with Justin Edinburgh at his side as coach. Using a team of experts including Dr. Adam Carey from Celebrity Fit Club fame (Nutrition and Diet), Angie Dowds from TV's The Biggest Loser: UK Season 1 (Personal Training) and Keith Power (Sport psychology and mental health), the team got the contestants fitter, healthier, happier and on the road to a better future.

Celebrity football stars were introduced during training to give the "team" tips and tricks to help them on the road to their full 90-minute match planned for the final episode at the Dagenham and Redbridge football ground.

The series consisted of nine one-hour episodes and one 60-minute special. The 10 part show was broadcast in late 2006 and has been repeated several times since on Bravo and Dave.

Special guests
 Luther Blissett - former England international
 Dean Kiely - former Irish international
 Paul Walsh - ex-Premiership footballer
 Alex Best - ex-wife of George Best

Opposing Teams Played 
 Charlton Under 16's
 London Tigers Senior 1st Team Website
 Wickford Pub Team "The Duke"

The Team 

 Burnside (Goalkeeper) - For his likeness to The Bill's character.  A.K.A. Russ Abbott, Grant Mitchell & Right Said Fred .
 Puke - Vomited on the team coach on the way to the 1st day of training
 Mad Dog - "Humungous Gonads" Don't make him mad! p.s. don't call him nob rot.
 The Head - Because of the size of his head to his body and shaven legs!
 Puddles - A small accident whilst laughing on day 1 meant he's labelled forever.
 Flatscreen - Boxing is his game, and he has the nose to prove it
 Mingle - Unable to say Michael as a child, this name stuck
 Mo - simply short, for Morris.
 Liberace - A magician on the piano and on the pitch, his delicate tones calmed the team.  
 The Landlord - Ex publican and now ex-smoker (for the camera).
 Billy Joel - An uncanny likeness to Billy Joel and a tribute act too.
 Arafat - Yasser didn't have much to pick on, so the obvious came out.
 Fireman Sam - A wannabe firefighter, getting fit to achieve this dream
 Salad Bar - A protein problem means he can only eat salad, so where's the weight come from? - Catchphrase "Im sorry but i just dont wanna do it".
 The Pimp (Thrown Out) - You really have to see him to believe it! 
 Sick Note (Eliminated at Bootcamp) 
 Lemar (Eliminated at Bootcamp & Returned) - The nicest guy you'll ever meet.

The Final 
The team were presented with a final match played at Dagenham & Redbridge football ground.  The opposing team consisted of Ex-England players from yesteryear.
 Southall (in Goal)
 Matt Le Tissier
 Frank McAvennie
 Francis (Frank) Benali
 Kerry Dixon
 Martin Chivers
 Paul Parker
 Blackmore
 Bolder
 Walker
 Aldridge
 Sedgley
 Kennedy
 Peter Beardsley (Failed to arrive)

2000s British reality television series
Sports reality television series